Bennett C I Okoro is an Anglican bishop in Nigeria.

He was born on the 24th of November 1949 in Imo State. Okoro was educated at Union Secondary School, Enugu, the American College and Seminary in Manhattan, New York and the Lincoln University. He was ordained in 1976. He was chaplain to the Federal Teachers College, Lokoja then Vicar of Christ Church, Lokoja. He began working in the Diocese of Orlu in 1984. He was appointed Canon Residentiary of St. Paul's  Cathedral Nkwerre. In 1988, he became Archdeacon of Etiti. He was elected Bishop of Okigwe South in 1993, and was later translated to  Orlu. He became Archbishop of Owerri in 2002, serving until 2013.

Okoro was consecrated as the pioneer Bishop of Okigwe South on 16 January 1994 at St. Michael's Cathedral Aba.

He retired as Bishop of Orlu in 2019.

Notes

1949 births
Living people
Anglican bishops of Orlu
21st-century Anglican bishops in Nigeria
People from Imo State
Anglican archbishops of Owerri
Anglican bishops of Okigwe South
Church of Nigeria archdeacons